"Till the End of the Day" is a song by the Kinks, written by Ray Davies and released as a single in 1965 and later on their album The Kink Kontroversy. It centres on a power chord, like many of the group's early hits, and was similarly successful, reaching number eight in the United Kingdom and number 50 in the United States, spending eight weeks or more in each chart.

Background
Davies recalled of the process of writing the song,

Of the song's meaning, Davies said, "That song was about freedom, in the sense that someone's been a slave or locked up in prison. It’s a song about escaping something. I didn't know it was about my state of mind."

Billboard described the song as a "rockin' dance beat wailer with up-beat lyric."  Cash Box described the single as a "rollicking, fast-moving, bluesy romancer about a fella who is especially hung-up on his gal."

Cover versions

A cover version by Big Star appeared on the CD release of Third/Sister Lovers. Alex Chilton, the singer for Big Star, would eventually record the song with Davies 30 years later for Davies' album See My Friends.

The song was covered by Japanese band Shonen Knife and is one of four songs on the CD single "Brown Mushrooms And Other Delights" from their Rock Animals album released in 1993.

Ty Segall's band, Fuzz, covered the song on their 2013 debut album.

Former KISS guitarist Ace Frehley recorded a cover of the song on his solo covers album: Origins, Vol. 1, released in April 2016.

Personnel 
According to band researcher Doug Hinman:

The Kinks
Ray Davies lead vocal, electric guitar
Dave Davies backing vocal, electric guitar
Pete Quaife backing vocal, bass
Mick Avory tambourine

Additional musicians
Clem Cattini drums
Rasa Davies backing vocal
Nicky Hopkins piano

Charts

References

Sources

 
 
 

The Kinks songs
1965 singles
Song recordings produced by Shel Talmy
Songs written by Ray Davies
Pye Records singles
Reprise Records singles
1965 songs
Number-one singles in Sweden